Vrsno may refer to:

 Vrsno, Kobarid, a village in Slovenia
 Vrsno, Croatia, a village near Šibenik